Eduardo Brito National Theater is part of the Plaza de la Cultura (Culture Plaza) complex, located in Santo Domingo, Dominican Republic. The theatre opened on August 16, 1973 and is the centerpiece of the complex. It is surrounded by several museums and cultural institutions. The complex is located on the Avenida Máximo Gomez, a central artery of the city of Santo Domingo. In 1977, it hosted the Miss Universe pageant. In 2006, the theatre was named after Eduardo Brito, a famous Dominican opera singer, by presidential decree.

The theatre was designed by Dominican architect Teófilo Carbonell and it was opened on August 16, 1973. The theatre's main hall, Sala Carlos Piantini, is named after the Dominican violinist and conductor who was the theatre's first musical director. The hall seats 1,600 spectators. The 24 by 25 meters stage can easily accommodate 250 people, while the orchestra can seat 120 musicians. Another hall, Sala Ravelo, is named after a Dominican musician and can seat 189 spectators. This secondary hall is dedicated exclusively to theatrical productions.

The theatre's facade is articulated by classic arches made of travertine marble. The building has four levels that, in addition to the two main halls, house the administrative offices, a reception hall, the Sala de la Cultura (Culture Hall) and a bar. The Sala de la Cultura, with a capacity of 220 spectators, was created for piano concerts, chamber concerts, symposia, seminars, and cultural events of similar scale.

Other institutions located within the building are the Biblioteca del Teatro (Theatre's Library), which was funded by Cuban artist Teresita Jimenez and the French embassy, and the Centro de Recuperación, Conservación y Difusión de la Música Dominicana (Center for Recovery, Preservation and Dissemination of Dominican Music), which stores historical information related to Dominican music.

See also 
 List of concert halls

External links
 official web site

Opera houses in the Dominican Republic
Teatro Nacional (Santo Domingo)
Teatro Nacional (Santo Domingo)
Theatres completed in 1973
Music venues completed in 1973